Guglielmo da Marsiglia (1475–1537) was an Italian painter of stained glass of the 16th century. He is also known as Guglielmo da Marcillat, and was a native of Dt. Michiel near Meuse, France.

He created 3 windows in 1519   for the Cathedral of Arezzo for a fee of 180 ducats. He completed two windows in the church of Santa Maria del Popolo composed of 12 scenes from the lives of Christ and The Virgin Mary (1509). He also painted in frescos. One of his pupils was the painter, architect and biographer Giorgio Vasari.

References

1475 births
1537 deaths
15th-century Italian painters
Italian male painters
16th-century Italian painters
Italian Renaissance painters

de:Guglielmo de Marcillat